Robert Daniel Scinto (born February 16, 1947) is a Connecticut commercial real estate developer, and founder, chief executive officer and chairman of the board of R. D. Scinto, Inc., and a convicted felon in Shelton.

Early life and education 
Scinto was born in Bridgeport, Connecticut, February 16, 1947, the son of Daniel Scinto and Doxie Andrews Scinto (1918–2013). He graduated from Andrew Warde High School in Fairfield in 1965 and attended Sacred Heart University in Fairfield at night, graduating in 1971 with a Bachelor of Arts degree in business administration.

Biography 
While attending Sacred Heart University, Robert Scinto worked by day as a plumber in his father's business, D and R Plumbing, in Bridgeport.  His initial rehabilitation project was of a three-family house in Bridgeport, the first of some 20 rehabs he undertook between 1971 and 1975. In 1975, R.D. Scinto, Inc. i77constructed its first apartment house, a 22-unit structure at 300 French St. in Bridgeport. The second, a 39-unit apartment house in Bridgeport, went up in 1979. In the same year he began initiating projects in Shelton, beginning with construction of the State National Bank building in that community.

Expansion of business 
Incremental and steady growth has characterized R.D. Scinto, Inc. over the years. Scinto properties can be found in Trumbull, Fairfield, Wilton and Naugatuck, as well as Shelton.

Scinto has been renowned as a vital structure in many of the communities that he develops. For example, countless supporters attended his 2011 hearing when he was accused of making false statements to an FBI agent in 2008 regarding inappropriate gifts to city officials. After pleading guilty, Scinto was sentenced to six months in federal prison plus 2 years of supervised release, though still he remains a dedicated and vital part of his area.

Scinto has bounced back headfirst into his business, and has been spearheading many exciting new projects. The most recent is the Medical Center of Fairfield County in Trumbull, which opened in March, 2013. The state-of-the-art facility is home to the Surgery Center of Fairfield County, replete with surgical suites, recovery bays and offices for physicians and medical personnel. The 34 buildings in the R. D. Scinto, Inc. network include 3.2 million square feet of office space. Ninetyeight percent is occupied. It is now a $200 million corporation. The centerpiece of Scinto's enterprise is the 65-acre campus on Corporate Drive in Shelton, whose 11 buildings are home to an array of corporate entities, including Cartier, Prudential Financial, Iriquois Gas, Sikorsky, Blum Shapiro and Ganim Financial. Situated among the buildings is Scinto's Il Palio Ristorante, named for the famed medieval horse race held twice annually in Siena, Italy. In front of the restaurant the statue of two horses of the Palio sculpt by Sergio Benvenuti and cast by the Ferdinando Marinelli Artistic Foundry of Florence, Italy

Supporter of the Arts 
Among the pieces of art displayed on the Shelton campus are copies of two classic sculptures: a soaring rendition of Michelangelo's "David," cast by Ferdinando Marinelli Artistic Foundry of Florence, Italy and a dramatic interpretive rendering of Leonardo da Vinci's "Vitruvian Man" by noted American sculptor Babette Bloch. At the dedication of the latter, art historian Dr. Philip Eliasoph of Fairfield University dubbed Scinto "Roberto da Shelton, or Roberto Prince of Fairfield County". William Shakespeare also has a home on the campus. Tuesday evenings find lovers of the Bard filling the campus auditorium for presentations on his works in a series called Nights With Shakespeare. The series was prompted by Bob and Barbara Scinto's fascination with the classics.

Honors and awards 
Scinto has received the Distinguished Achievement Award from the Connecticut Construction Institute, the Bridgeport Rescue Mission Award for helping the homeless, the Patron of the Year Award from the Fairfield Arts Council, the Kennedy Center Vision Award, and the Toby Award of the Southern Connecticut Building Owners and Management Association, among others.

References

External links 
 About Bob Scinto

American real estate businesspeople
1947 births
Living people